Bobby Kingsbury (born August 30, 1980) in Cleveland, Ohio, is an American baseball player. He is a two-time Atlantic 10 Player of the Year and went on to play in the Pittsburgh Pirates minor-league organization. Kingsbury was the first baseball player to earn back-to-back Atlantic 10 Player of the Year Awards, in 2001 and 2002.  He went to school at Fordham where he set an NCAA record for stolen bases in a game (8), and was drafted by the Pirates in the 8th round of the 2002 Major League Baseball Draft, but his excellent glove, a quick bat, an intelligent hitting approach, and his work ethic could have given him a third or fourth-round pick if he'd gone to a warm-weather college.

During the 2004 Summer Olympics held in Athens, Greece, Kingsbury, who has a Greek grandmother, was given the chance to play for the host nation, Greece.  Most of the players on the Greek baseball team were Americans with Greek heritage, including North Florida coach Dusty Rhodes, and White Sox scout John Kazanas, Clay Bellinger of the Orioles, outfielders Nick Markakis the Orioles and Nick Theodorou of the Dodgers, and catchers Mike Tonis of Royals and George Kottaras of the Padres.

Kingsbury, an alumnus and 2008 Hall of Fame inductee of Fordham University and current member of the Pittsburgh Pirates organization, picked up one of the biggest hits of the tournament for Greece, an RBI triple, in their lone win, which came against Italy in the preliminary round.

In the spring of 2006, Kingsbury was invited to the Pirates major-league camp in Bradenton, FL as a non-roster invitee.  During the seventh inning of the first game against the Philadelphia Phillies, Kingsbury dove for a ball in right field and upon hitting the ground dislocated his left throwing shoulder.  He fully tore his rotator cuff and labrum thus ending his 2006 campaign.

External links

Fordham Rams baseball players
1980 births
Baseball players at the 2004 Summer Olympics
American people of Greek descent
Living people
Olympic baseball players of Greece
Greek baseball players
Baseball players from Cleveland
Williamsport Crosscutters players
Hickory Crawdads players
Lynchburg Hillcats players